Copa de la Diversión is an initiative by Minor League Baseball to promote the sport and connect its teams to their Hispanic/Latino communities. Teams adopt a culturally-relevant on-field persona for certain games each season.

History
The promotion started in 2017 with the Es Divertido Ser Un Fan ("It's Fun to Be a Fan") fan engagement program. Four teams participated: the Las Vegas 51s, who took the field as the Reyes de Plata ("Silver Kings"); the Charlotte Knights as the Charlotte Caballeros; the Visalia Rawhide, who played as the Visalia Toros; and the Kane County Cougars, who did not change their name for the promotion.

In 2018, the program was renamed Copa de la Diversión and expanded to 33 teams. A trophy (the "Fun Cup") was awarded to the Albuquerque Isotopes franchise, who played as the Mariachis de Nuevo México and set new attendance records during Copa games. In 2019, participation increased to 72 teams. Six teams that participated in 2018 using direct Spanish translations of their usual team name adopted new identities for 2019. The number of participants increased to 92 for the 2020 season.

In addition to changing monikers for Copa games, teams also utilize alternate logos, color schemes, jerseys, and hats. The re-branding inspirations have ranged from historical, such as the Reyes de Plata in reference to the contributions migrant workers made to the mining industry of Nevada, to culinary, with the Columbia Fireflies playing as the Chicharrones de Columbia.

The 2020 minor league season was cancelled due to the COVID-19 pandemic. Following the 2020 season, Major League Baseball assumed control of Minor League Baseball in a move to increase player salaries, modernize facility standards, and reduce travel. This reorganization and elimination of some teams reduced Copa participants to 76 clubs in 2021. Following the 2021 season, the Worcester Red Sox, who played Copa games as "Los Wepas de Worcester", were awarded the Fun Cup trophy.

In 2022, participation grew to 85 teams.

Participating teams

Former identities

Notes

References

External links 

Minor league baseball
2017 establishments in the United States
Mexican culture